Casanova's Big Night is a 1954 American comedy film starring Bob Hope and Joan Fontaine, which is a spoof of swashbuckling historical adventure films. It was directed by Norman Z. McLeod.

Hope plays a tailor who impersonates Giacomo Casanova, the great lover. The film also stars Audrey Dalton, Basil Rathbone, Hugh Marlowe, John Carradine, Hope Emerson, Lon Chaney, Jr., Raymond Burr, Natalie Schafer, and Vincent Price (in a cameo appearance as the real Casanova).

Plot
Pippo, a tailor, impersonates Casanova to woo the girls, particularly the widow Bruni. Casanova has left town, pursued by creditors who persuade Pippo to impersonate Casanova at the behest of a Genoan family that will pay "Casanova" to test the fidelity of the son's betrothed.

Pippo, the widow Bruni and Casanova's valet Lucio travel to Venice.  The Doge of Venice, "a snake with whiskers," to use Pippo's description, intends to use the intended seduction as an excuse to wage war against Genoa. After many humorous adventures, exploiting Pippo's traits of vanity, arrogance and cowardice, the heroine so impresses Pippo with her dignity that he refuses to cooperate in the plot to ruin her character. He is arrested by the Doge and sentenced to death by be heading.  A desperate Pippo turns the audience for help, but is shocked when they prefer that he lose his head.

Cast

 Bob Hope as Pippo Popolino
 Joan Fontaine as Francesca Bruni
 Audrey Dalton as Elena Di Gambetta
 Basil Rathbone as Lucio / Narrator
 Hugh Marlowe as Stefano Di Gambetta
 Arnold Moss as The Doge
 John Carradine as Foressi
 John Hoyt as Maggiorin
 Hope Emerson as Duchess of Castelbello
 Robert Hutton as Raphael, Duc of Castelbello
 Lon Chaney Jr. as Emo the Murderer (as Lon Chaney)
 Raymond Burr as Bragadin
 Frieda Inescort as Signora Di Gambetta
 Primo Carnera as Corfa
 Frank Puglia as Carabaccio
 Paul Cavanagh as Signor Alberto Di Gambetta
 Romo Vincent as Giovanni
 Henry Brandon as Captain Rugello
 Natalie Schafer as Signora Foressi
 Douglas Fowley as Second Prisoner
 Nestor Paiva as Gnocchi
 Lucien Littlefield as First Prisoner
 Vincent Price as Casanova (cameo)

References

External links
 
 
 

1954 films
Paramount Pictures films
Films directed by Norman Z. McLeod
Films scored by Lyn Murray
American historical comedy films
1950s historical comedy films
Films about Giacomo Casanova
Films with screenplays by Aubrey Wisberg
1950s English-language films
1950s American films